Bouillé-Ménard is a commune in the Maine-et-Loire department in western France. It is the antipode of the Bounty Islands.

Population

See also
Communes of the Maine-et-Loire department

References

Communes of Maine-et-Loire